The Larry Storch Show is an American comic variety show that aired live on CBS from July 11, 1953, to September 12, 1953. The series was the summer replacement for ''The Jackie Gleason Show.

Summary
Larry Storch and his guests were featured in comedy sketches. Among the characters Storch played from his club act were 10-year-old Victor, TV cowboy Smillie Higgins, and Railroad Jack.

Regulars
Larry Storch
Ray Bloch and his orchestra

References

1950s American variety television series
1953 American television series debuts
1953 American television series endings
CBS original programming
American live television series
Black-and-white American television shows